Papaver rupifragum is a species of flowering plant in the poppy family, Papaveraceae. It is native to Morocco and Spain.

References

rupifragum
Taxa named by Pierre Edmond Boissier
Taxa named by George François Reuter
Flora of Morocco
Flora of Spain